Carmen Miranda Museum (Museu Carmen Miranda), located in the Parque Brigadeiro Eduardo Gomes (Flamengo Park), is a museum established in homage to singer and actress Carmen Miranda and open to the public since 1976. The museum was officially opened on the 21st anniversary of her death.

The museum exhibits iconographic costumes, including her tall fruit hats and platform-heeled shoes, and artifacts belonging to Carmen, as well as many of her records and films. In the second half of 2015, the new headquarters for the Carmen Miranda Museum will be opened at Rio de Janeiro's new Museum of Image and Sound (MIS).

History

The Carmen Miranda Museum was officially created in 1956, through a decree signed by Francisco de Lima Negrão, Governor of the Federal District.  But its inauguration took place twenty years later, on August 5, 1976, by the Governor of Rio de Janeiro Floriano Peixoto Faria Lima. Installed in Flamengo Park, the circular building was designed by architect Affonso Eduardo Reidy, later adapted by architect Ulisses Burlemaqui.

The establishment of the museum was a response to the population and the legion of admirers, especially outsiders from various parts of the world, organized in numerous fan clubs, who wanted a space that could perpetuate the memory of the singer, one of the myths of Brazilian popular music. The museum in Rio de Janeiro, has over 3,500 items which help pay a tribute to the singer and actress Carmen Miranda (Feb.9, 1909-Aug.5, 1955). About 200 items are on display. A great part of the museum collection is available for research upon request.

Roughly 460 of the items in the collection are garments and accessories. You'll see some of the famous platform shoes five-foot tall that Carmen (known as the Pequena Notável, or the "Notable Little One") wore in throughout her career. There are also glam dresses, like the one she wore for her last show, day before she died; and some of her signature turbans, including the one she wore for her wedding. You'll also see plenty of balangandãs - the dangling charms that were part of Carmen's baiana style.

Initially meant as a Flamengo Park leisure center, the construction was adapted for its current use by Ulisses Burlemaqui in 1975.

Currently the museum is closed to the public, while its collection is being prepared to compose the collection of the future of the Museum of Image and Sound (Museu da Imagem e do Som) in Copacabana.

Collection

Its collection has some three thousand and five hundred pieces, mostly personal belongings of the artist, donated by the family after her death in 1955, through her sister Aurora Miranda and widower David Alfred Sebastian.

It consists of musical scores, scripts, programs and costumes, and their collection of clothing, with costumes social and scenes, jewelry, platform shoes, turbans and accessories. With highlights, the skirt worn in The Streets of Paris, on Broadway in 1939, the turban worn at their wedding, the clothing worn the night she was honored in Grauman's Chinese Theatre in 1941. A large number of her publicity photos are on display blown up to near life-size, along with smaller photos showing the story of her life and career (2,000 photos), also on display is the outfit  she wore to the 1941 Academy Awards ceremony, as well as jewelry and accessories, including some of her trademark tall fruit hats. The museum also has a large collection of video documentaries, biographies, the movies she starred in, and a compilation of her songs.

About ten thousand people visit the museum each year. The museum also has a collection of over 2,000 photos. The museum also preserves original screenplays of films made in the United States, photographs, posters, trophies and awards. In addition to five thousand newspaper clippings and magazines that report historical events of the "Brazilian bombshell".

In February 2009, the museum opened the celebration of Carmen Miranda's birth centennial. As part of the birth centennial year kickoff, the museum got a life-size resin statue of Carmen, created by artist Ulysses Rabelo, who studied her death mask and dental arch for the project. The statue wears the actual dress Carmen donned in That Night in Rio (1941).

For many years, Cecilia Miranda de Carvalho (one of Miranda's sisters) was the manager of the collection of museu.

Permanent Exhibition
A large number of her publicity photos are on display blown up to near life-size, along with smaller photos showing the story of her life and career, also on display is the outfit  she wore to the 1941 Academy Awards ceremony, as well as jewelry and accessories, including the trademark tall fruit hats. The museum also has a large collection of video documentaries, biographies, the movies she starred in, and a compilation of her songs.

Highlights include the marriage certificate of Carmen Miranda and David Alfred Sebastian (1947), a mention honourable of U.S. Government to Miranda for their services rendered in World War II, a program of the show A night in Rio at Waldorf Astoria New York (1939) and other documents that show the trajectory of Carmen Miranda. There is also a collection of musical scores, composed of 980 items, highlighted for 80 printed scores of the 1930s. The Carmen Miranda Museum tells the story of the artist who, in a short time became one of the icons of national culture of Brazil.

New Headquarters
In Brazil, the most important recent tributes to the great star are her official website and the announced incorporation of the Carmen Miranda Museum in the Rio de Janeiro's new Museum of Image and Sound (MIS), to be opened in the second half of 2015. Construction of the new MIS building in Copacabana, with a project by Diller Scofidio + Renfro, is already under way.

With the new building, the direction of MIS hopes that the new museum receives approximately 600,000 visitors per year.

See also 
 Museu da Imagem e do Som do Rio de Janeiro
 List of music museums

References

External links
Carmen Miranda Museum website
Virtual exhibition

Museums established in 1976
Museums in Rio de Janeiro (city)
Affonso Eduardo Reidy buildings
Carmen Miranda